Elizabeth Cady Stanton Blake (December 31, 1894 – November 24, 1981) was an American painter.

Life and career
Blake was born in New York City, and enjoyed a comfortable childhood until her father's death in 1906, whereupon the family moved to New Hampshire for a time. They next moved to Jamaica Plain, Massachusetts, where she finished her schooling. Due to poor health she was forced to forego college, enrolling instead at the Knox School, where she developed a passion for art that took her to the Art Students League of New York. Among her instructors were George Bridgman, F. Luis Mora, Albert Sterner, and Cecilia Beaux, with whom she would go on to develop a close relationship.

In 1925 Stanton met William Harold Blake, whom she married on March 26, 1927; she gave up her career painting portraits on her marriage. The couple had one child, a daughter, Elizabeth Stanton "Bettina" Blake, born in 1929. William Blake headed the English Department of the Horace Mann School, and this allowed his wife to find opportunities for involvement at Columbia University and other organizations of the surrounding community; she continued to be active as a volunteer until the mid-1970s, when her age forced her to curtail her activities. She died in 1981, and is buried in the Agawam Cemetery in Wareham, Massachusetts.

Blake was a member during her career of the American Federation of Arts, the Barnard Club, the National Association of Women Painters and Sculptors, and the Tiffany Foundation. A collection of her papers is held by Columbia University, while other papers were donated by her daughter to the Archives of American Art at the Smithsonian Institution. An award given by the National Association of Women Artists bears her name.

References

1894 births
1981 deaths
American portrait painters
American women painters
20th-century American painters
20th-century American women artists
Painters from New York City
Art Students League of New York alumni
People from Jamaica Plain